The name Emu bush is a common name for several species of plants in Australia:

 Several species of the genus Eremophila
 Hakea laurina, endemic to Western Australia